The rank structure of the Royal Australian Air Force (RAAF) has been inherited from the Royal Air Force (RAF).  The RAF based its officer ranks on the Royal Navy, and its airmen ranks on the British Army.

Unlike the RAF, RAAF rank abbreviations are always written in uppercase without spaces (e.g. Pilot Officer is written as PLTOFF, not Plt Off).  Also, the RAAF does not have the ranks of Senior Aircraftman, Junior Technician, Chief Technician or Master Aircrew.

The rank insignia is very similar to that of the RAF, with the exception of Leading Aircraftman (LAC)/Leading Aircraftwoman (LACW) which is one chevron (two-bladed propeller in RAF).  Both officers and airmen wear rank insignia on the chest when wearing General Purpose Uniform or Disruptive Pattern Combat Uniform. Rank insignia is worn on the shoulder in all other orders of dress with the exception of the Service Dress tunic where it is worn on the lower sleeve for officers and Warrant Officers and the upper sleeve for airmen and the working uniform of Physical Training Instructors where it is worn on the sleeve. The word 'Australia' appears immediately below all rank insignia worn on the shoulder or chest.

The most senior active rank of the RAAF, Air Marshal a three-star rank, is held by the Chief of Air Force. On the occasions that the Chief of the Defence Force is an officer of the RAAF, the rank of Air Chief Marshal is awarded. The rank of Marshal of the Royal Australian Air Force has never been held as an active rank and it was held as an honorary rank by Prince Philip, Duke of Edinburgh until his death in 2021.

Officers

Air Officers

Senior Officers

Junior Officers

Other ranks

Warrant Officer

Non-Commissioned Officers

Aircraftmen/women

Special insignia

See also

Australian Defence Force ranks and insignia
Australian Army officer rank insignia
Australian Army enlisted rank insignia

References and notes

Notes

References

External links
 Royal Australian Air Force (RAAF) - Official site
 Air Force ranks
 ADF Badges of rank (copyright)
 ADF Pay & Conditions Manual - Equivalent ranks and classifications

Royal Australian Air Force
Air force ranks